Giovanni Pelliccioli is an Italian surrealist painter. He was born in 1947 at San Pellegrino, Terme,  Italy. When he was eight he discovered art and started drawing. At 18 he began art studies at Carrara Academy of Bergame. At this time he painted realist and impressionist style paintings, but when he discovered surrealism he knew it would permit him to give the best of his artistic expression. Since then he has worked as a professional surrealist painter. In 40 years he has painted more than 4200 paintings.

In 1993, Pelliccioli created a new form in the world of the artistic painting - the "triangle". It is a picture cut in a diagonal with a three-dimensional definition. This exclusive idea is patented by the artist.

Pelliccioli's work is presented in more than 100 exhibitions in Italy and abroad.

He is listed in the World Cultural Union at: The Museum of Modern Art (New York), the Tate Gallery (London), Galerie des 20 Jahrhunderts (Berlin), the Tokio Kukuritisu Kindai Bkjutsukan (Tokia), the National Gallery of Canada (Ottawa), the Musee d’Art Moderne (Paris), the Kunsthaus (Zurich), the National Gallery of Victoria (Australia), the National Museum (Stockholm), the Galleria Nacional de Arte Moderna (Buenos Aires), the National Gallery of Art (Hilton of Athens), the Country Museum of Art (Los Angeles) and many others.

Pelliccioli left Italy in 1993 and established himself in France at Antibes (French Riviera).
He got his own workplace there.

Personal Exhibitions

CD covers 
A couple of paintings is used for classic music.

Books

References

1947 births
Living people